Christopher Street is a station on the PATH system. Located on Christopher Street between Greenwich and Hudson Streets in the Greenwich Village neighborhood of Manhattan, New York City, it is served by the Hoboken–33rd Street and Journal Square–33rd Street lines on weekdays, and by the Journal Square–33rd Street (via Hoboken) line on weekends.

History

The station opened on February 25, 1908, as part of the Hudson and Manhattan Railroad extension between New Jersey and 33rd Street. It received a renovation in 1986, during which the station was closed completely for a period of time.

The station has long seen heavy traffic not only from passengers going to Jersey City and Hoboken, but also by Manhattan residents traveling from Greenwich Village to Midtown. The nearest subway station, Christopher Street-Sheridan Square, is a block away.

The already busy station received even more passengers after the September 11, 2001 attacks, which resulted in the destruction of the World Trade Center PATH station. With Christopher Street becoming the closest PATH station to New Jersey, it started experiencing serious overcrowding. The Port Authority had to make it an exit-only station during the morning rush hour. The Port Authority planned to build a second entrance at Christopher and Bedford Street (a block and a half east of the current entrance), to ease overcrowding at the station, but local opposition caused the project to be canceled. Residents were concerned that the project would endanger the surrounding neighborhood's fragile historic buildings (through the vibrations that a major construction project would cause) and disrupt business and traffic.

In 2002, Christopher Street station was used by an average of 7,400 people per day, or about 2.701 million per year. This was more than twice as many as the 1.314 million passengers that used the station during 2001.

Station layout

The station entrance is in its own free-standing building, with a restored marquee displaying the original "Hudson Tunnels" name adorning the entranceway. Passengers descend a narrow stairway with a number of curves before arriving at the southwest end of the narrow center island platform.

Biff Elrod's mural "Ascent-Descent" (showing images of users of the PATH trains, ascending or descending the stairs) originally painted on site in August 1986 as a temporary installation for the Public Art Fund, and later purchased by Port Authority of New York and New Jersey, was restored in 1999.

References

External links 

PATH - Christopher Street Station
Hudson & Manhattan Railroad/Hudson Tubes
 Christopher Street entrance from Google Maps Street View
 Platform from Google Maps Street View

PATH stations in Manhattan
Christopher Street
Railway stations in the United States opened in 1908
West Village
1908 establishments in New York City
Railway stations located underground in New York (state)